Joyce Alice Brown  (born 29 September 1938) is a former Australia netball international and national team head coach. Brown captained Australia at the inaugural 1963 World Netball Championships, winning a gold medal. She later coached Australia at the 1975, 1983 and 1991 World Netball Championships and at the 1993 World Games, guiding the team to four gold medals. Brown never lost a World Netball Championship match, either as a player or coach. In 1992 she was awarded the Medal of the Order of Australia. Between 1999 and 2002, Brown served as head coach of Melbourne Phoenix in the Commonwealth Bank Trophy league, leading them to the premiership in 2000 and 2002. Brown also served as a netball umpire and sports administrator.

Early life, family and education
Brown is the daughter of Doug Anderson, who during the 1920s played Australian rules football for Fitzroy. In her youth, Brown played tennis, before taking up netball in primary school. She graduated from the University of Melbourne as a physical education teacher. Together with her husband, Colin, she lived in Mooroolbark. Their son, Fraser Brown, played Australian rules football for Carlton during the 1990s.

Playing career

Victoria
Between 1958 and 1963, Brown played for Victoria in the Australian National Netball Championships. In 2000, together with Sharelle McMahon, Wilma Shakespear, Myrtle Baylis, Shelley O'Donnell and Simone McKinnis, Brown was named in Netball Victoria's Team of the Century.

Australia
Brown captained Australia at the inaugural 1963 World Netball Championships, winning a gold medal. The team was coached by Lorna McConchie and also featured Wilma Shakespear. Brown made all her nine senior appearances for Australia at the 1963 tournament.

Coaching career

Victoria
Between 1972 and 1975 and again in 1979, Brown coached Victoria in the Australian National Netball Championships.

Australia
Brown coached Australia at the 1975, 1983 and 1991 World Netball Championships and at the 1993 World Games, guiding the team to four goal medals. In 1992 Brown, along with the rest of the gold medal-winning 1991 World Netball Championship squad, were awarded the Medal of the Order of Australia. In 2008, Brown was inducted into the Australian Netball Hall of Fame.

Melbourne Phoenix
Between 1999 and 2002, Brown served as head coach of Melbourne Phoenix in the Commonwealth Bank Trophy league, leading them to the premiership in 2000.

Umpire and administrator
Brown has also served as a netball umpire and sports administrator. She has served as a board member of the Australian Institute of Sport, the Confederation of Australian Sport, Netball Victoria and Netball Australia.

Joyce Brown Coach of the Year
In 2014 Netball Australia introduced the Joyce Brown Coach of the Year award. Past winners have included Roselee Jencke, Lisa Alexander, Simone McKinnis and Stacey Marinkovich.

Honours

Player
Australia
World Netball Championships
Winners: 1963

Head coach
Australia
World Netball Championships
Winners: 1975, 1983, 1991
World Games
Winners: 1993
Melbourne Phoenix
Commonwealth Bank Trophy
Winners: 2000

Individual awards

Bibliography

References

1938 births
Living people
Australian netball players
Australia international netball players
Netball players from Melbourne
Australian netball administrators
Australian netball umpires
Australian women referees and umpires
Australian netball coaches
Australia national netball team coaches
Melbourne Phoenix coaches
Commonwealth Bank Trophy coaches
Recipients of the Medal of the Order of Australia
Recipients of the Australian Sports Medal
Recipients of the Centenary Medal
Sport Australia Hall of Fame inductees
University of Melbourne alumni sportspeople
University of Melbourne women
Australian schoolteachers
1963 World Netball Championships players